Rosa Rosanova (June 23, 1869 – May 29, 1944) was a Russian-born stage and film actress. She appeared in numerous American films as a starring or supporting actress in the 1920s and 1930s

Biography 
Born in Russia, Rosanova completed her schooling at age 16 in Moscow. As an actress, she toured with the Svatloff repertory company in Russia, and in 1906 travelled to the United States touring with the Orlanoff company. She immigrated to the United States some time before the Russian Revolution.

Like Vera Gordon, Rosanova frequently portrayed Jewish mothers in early American silent films. Rosanova starred as such a character in Hungry Hearts (1922), His People (1925) and Lucky Boy (1929). In a 1929 profile, the Santa Ana Register described Rosanova's performance in Hungry Hearts as "a powerful characterization that was the outstanding performance of filmdom."

In her book You Never Call! You Never Write!: A History of the Jewish Mother, Joyce Antler described Rosanova as a "a Yiddish star.

Select filmography

Just Around the Corner (1921) as Mrs. Finshreiber
Hungry Hearts (1922)
Blood and Sand (1922) as Señora Angustias
The Wandering Jew (1923)
Fashion Row (1923) as Mama Levitzky
The Gentleman from America (1923) as Old Inez
The Lover of Camille (1924) as Madame Rabouir
The Virgin (1924) as The Widow
 When a Girl Loves (1924) as Ferdova
A Woman's Faith (1925) as Delima Turcott
His People (1925)
God Gave Me Twenty Cents (1926)
 Jake the Plumber (1927) as Mrs. Levine
Pleasure Before Business (1927) as Sarah Weinberg
The Shamrock and the Rose (1927) as Mrs. Cohen
Abie's Irish Rose (1928) as Sarah
The Younger Generation (1929) as Tilda (Ma) Goldfish
Lucky Boy (1929) as Mamma Jessel
After Tomorrow (1932)
Pilgrimage (1933)
Fighting Hero (1934) as Aunt J

References

External links

 

American silent film actresses
20th-century American actresses
Emigrants from the Russian Empire to the United States